The Kawanishi N1K was an Imperial Japanese Navy fighter aircraft, developed in two forms: the 
N1K Kyōfū ("Strong Wind", Allied reporting name "Rex"), a floatplane designed to support forward offensive operations where no airstrips were available, and  the N1K-J Shiden ("Violet Lightning", reporting name "George"), a land-based version of the N1K. The N1K-J was considered by both its pilots and opponents to be one of the finest land-based fighters flown by the Japanese during World War II.

An improved variant, the N1K2-J "Shiden-Kai" (紫電改) first flew on 1 January 1944. The Shiden Kai possessed heavy armament, as well as surprisingly good maneuverability, due to a mercury switch that automatically extended the flaps during turns. These "combat" flaps created more lift, thereby allowing tighter turns. Unlike the Mitsubishi A6M Zero, the Shiden Kai could compete against the best late-war Allied fighters, such as the F6F Hellcat, F4U Corsair, and P-51 Mustang.

Design and development

Kawanishi's N1K was originally built as a single pontoon floatplane fighter to support forward offensive operations where no airstrips were available, but by 1943 when the aircraft entered service, Japan was firmly on the defensive, and there was no longer a need for a fighter to fulfill this role. It was powered by the Mitsubishi MK4C Kasei 13 14-cylinder radial engine.

The requirement to carry a bulky, heavy float essentially crippled the N1K against contemporary American fighters. However, Kawanishi engineers had proposed in late 1941 that the N1K would also be the basis of a formidable land-based fighter, and a land-based version was produced as a private venture by the company. This version flew on 27 December 1942, powered by a Nakajima NK9A Homare 11 18-cylinder radial engine, replacing the less powerful MK4C Kasei 13 of the N1K-1. The aircraft retained the mid-mounted wing of the floatplane; combined with the large propeller, this necessitated a long, stalky main landing gear. A unique feature was the aircraft's combat flaps that automatically adjusted in response to acceleration, freeing up the pilot's concentration and reducing the chance of stalling in combat. The N1K did have temperamental flight characteristics, however, that required an experienced touch at the controls.

The Nakajima Homare was powerful, but had been rushed into production before it was sufficiently developed, and proved troublesome. Another problem was landing gear failure due to poor heat treatment of the wheels. Apart from engine problems and the landing gear, the flight test program showed that the aircraft was promising. Prototypes were evaluated by the Navy, and since the aircraft was faster than the Zero and had a much longer range than the Mitsubishi J2M Raiden, it was ordered into production as the N1K1-J, the -J indicating a land-based fighter modification of the original floatplane fighter.

Only four days after the Shidens first test flight, a complete redesign began. The N1K2-J addressed the N1K1-J's major defects, primarily the mid-mounted wing and long landing gear. The wings were moved to a low position, which permitted the use of a shorter, conventional undercarriage. The fuselage was lengthened and the tail redesigned. The production of the entire aircraft was simplified: over a third of the parts used in the previous Shiden could still be used in its successor, while construction used fewer critical materials. The N1K1 redesign was approximately 250 kg (550 lb) lighter, and was faster and more reliable than its predecessor. The Homare engine was retained, even though reliability problems persisted, as no alternative was available. A prototype of the new version flew on 1 January 1944. After completing Navy trials in April, the N1K2-J was rushed into production. This variant was named the "Shiden-Kai" (紫電改), with Kai meaning modified.

Operational history

The N1K1-J Shiden entered service in early 1944. The N1K1-J, and the N1K2 Shiden-Kai released later that year were among the rare Japanese aircraft that offered pilots an even chance against late-war American designs, such as the F6F Hellcat and the F4U Corsair, and could be a formidable weapon in the hands of an ace. In February 1945 Lieutenant Kaneyoshi Muto, flying a N1K2-J as part of a formation of at least 10 expert Japanese pilots, faced seven US Navy Hellcat pilots, from squadron VF-82, in the sky over Japan; the formation shot down four Hellcats with no loss to themselves. After the action, Japanese propagandists fabricated a story in which Muto was the sole airman facing 12 enemy aircraft. (A leading Japanese ace, Saburō Sakai, later mentioned in his autobiography that Muto had actually done this feat at an earlier stage of the war – albeit at the controls of a Zero fighter.)

The N1K1-J aircraft were used very effectively over Formosa (Taiwan), the Philippines, and, later, Okinawa. Before production was switched to the improved N1K2-J, 1,007 aircraft were produced, including prototypes. Because of production difficulties and damage done by B-29 raids on factories, only 415 of the superior N1K2-J fighters were produced.

The N1K2-J Shiden-Kai proved to be one of the best dogfighting aircraft produced by either side. As a bomber interceptor, the N1K2-J fared less well, hampered by a poor rate of climb and a reduced engine performance at high altitude.

343 Kōkūtai

The N1K2-J Shiden-Kai offered a formidable, if demanding aircraft in limited quantities. As a result, the planes were distributed to elite naval fighter units such as 343 Kōkūtai ("343rd Naval Air Group") constituted on 25 December 1944 and commanded by Minoru Genda. The new Kōkūtai included some of Japan's most experienced fighter pilots, such as Naoshi Kanno and Saburo Sakai. The unit received the best available naval equipment, such as the Nakajima C6N Saiun, codenamed "Myrt" long-range reconnaissance aircraft.

On 18 March 1945 one of the "Myrts" spotted U.S. carriers en route to Japan. The following morning, Shiden aircraft flown by 343 Kōkūtai intercepted 300 American aircraft. Many of the  Shiden force were N1K2s. When the Shidens encountered Grumman F6F Hellcats from USN Fighter Bomber Squadron 17 (VBF-17), three aircraft were lost on both sides in the initial attack: one Hellcat and two Shidens were shot down by enemy ground fire, two fighters collided in mid-air, and one Hellcat crashed while trying to land. Another Shiden dived on a Hellcat group, and downed another one. In the end, the Hikōtai lost six fighters versus eight VBF-17 fighters on the other side.

Another noted encounter pitted the N1K against the Vought F4U Corsair; two Corsairs from VBF-10, accidentally separated from their main formations, were attacked by Shidens from the 343rd. Four N1K2s were shot down. The Corsairs managed to return to their carrier, . A second encounter took place, when pilots flying Shidens initially mistook Corsairs from Marine Fighter Squadron 123 (VMF-123) for Hellcats and attacked. A 30-minute aerial duel ensued, in which three Corsairs were shot down, and another five were damaged. Three other F4Us returned to their carriers, but were so heavily damaged that the planes were scrapped. No Shidens were lost to Corsairs in that aerial battle. Losses for the Japanese N1K pilots did occur in related action, however; two Shidens were shot down upon return for landing by Hellcats of Fighting Squadron 9 (VF-9), while many more Shidens were destroyed by American fighters over another airfield where, low on fuel, their pilots tried to land. At the end of the day the 343rd, claimed 52 kills and the U.S. squadrons 63. The actual losses were 15 Shidens and 13 pilots, a "Myrt", with its three-man crew, and nine other Japanese fighters. The U.S. also took heavy losses: 14 fighters and seven pilots, plus 11 attack aircraft. Five days later an unofficial award was sent to 343rd Kōkūtai for the valour shown on 19 March.

On 12 April 1945 another fierce battle involved 343rd, during the mass kamikaze attack Kikusui N.2. The Japanese recorded several kills, but suffered 12 losses out of 34 aircraft. On 4 May, another 24 Shidens were sent in Kikusui N.5.

In every encounter with enemy fighters, the Shiden, especially the Kai version, proved to be a capable dogfighter with a potent combination of firepower, agility, and rugged structure. The premier unit flying the Shiden, 343rd Kōkūtai, remained operational, until overwhelming unit losses obliged the group to stand down. The 343rd was disbanded on 14 August 1945, when the Emperor ordered surrender.

Variants
N1K1 Kyofu
 N1K1: Standard type as floatplane, which was used from early 1943, with Mitsubishi MK4C Kasei 13 engine.
 N1K2: Reserved name for an intended model with larger engine, not built.

N1K1-J Shiden
 N1K1-J Prototypes: development of fighter hydroplane N1K1 Kyofu, with 1,820 hp Homare 11 engine.
 N1K1-J Shiden Model 11: Navy Land Based Interceptor, first production model with 1,990 hp Homare 21 engine and revised cover, armed with two 7.7 mm Type 97 machine guns and two 20 mm Type 99 cannons. Modified total-vision cockpit.
 N1K1-Ja Shiden Model 11A: without frontal 7.7 mm Type 97s, with only four 20 mm Type 99s in wings.
 N1K1-Jb Shiden Model 11B: similar to Model 11A amongst load two 250 kg bombs, revised wing weapons.
 N1K1-Jc Shiden Model 11C: definitive fighter-bomber version, derived from Model 11B. Four bomb racks under wings.
 N1K1-J KAIa Experimental version with auxiliary rocket. One Model 11 conversion.
 N1K1-J KAIb Conversion for dive bombing. One 250 kg bomb under belly and six rockets under wings.

N1K2-J Shiden-KAI
 N1K2-J Prototypes: N1K1-Jb redesigned. Low wings, engine cover and landing gear modified. New fuselage and tail, 8 built.
 N1K2-J Shiden KAI Model 21: Navy Land Based Interceptor, first model of series with a Nakajima Homare 21 engine.
 N1K2-Ja Shiden KAI Model 21A: Fighter Interceptor version: 2,000 hp Homare 21-18 engine with a low wing and larger prop design with four 250 kg ground bombs. Fixed problem with teething pains of N1K2 J at high altitude.  
 N1K2-K Shiden Kai Rensen 1, Model A: Fighter Trainer, modified from N1K-J Series with two seats, operative or factory conversions.

Further variants
 N1K3-J Shiden KAI 1, Model 31: Prototypes: Engines displaced to ahead, two 13.2 mm Type 3 machine guns in front, 2 built.
 N1K3-A Shiden KAI 2, Model 41: Prototypes: Carrier-based version of N1K3-J, 2 built.
 N1K4-J Shiden KAI 3, Model 32: Prototypes: 2,000 hp Homare 23 engine, 2 built.
 N1K4-A Shiden KAI 4, Model 42: Prototype: Experimental conversion of N1K4-J example with equipment for use in carriers, 1 built.
 N1K5-J Shiden KAI 5, Model 25: High-Altitude Interceptor version with Mitsubishi HA-43 (MK9A) with 2,200 takeoff hp, project only.

Production

 First prototype completed in April 1942, and made its maiden flight on 6 May 1942.
 Pre-production started with eight prototypes and service trials aircraft completed from August 1942 to December 1942, and with a further five, in the following year.

 Pre-production started with nine prototypes and service trials aircraft completed from July 1943 to Aug. 1943.

 Pre-production started with eight prototypes and service trials aircraft completed from Dec. 1943 to May. 1944.

Surviving aircraft

All five surviving Shiden Kai aircraft are now displayed in American and Japanese museums.

One N1K2-J (s/n 5128, tail code A343-19) is at the National Naval Aviation Museum at Naval Air Station Pensacola, Florida.

The second N1K2-Ja (s/n 5312), a fighter-bomber variant equipped with wing mounts to carry bombs, is on display in the Air Power gallery at the National Museum of the United States Air Force, at Wright-Patterson Air Force Base near Dayton, Ohio. This aircraft was displayed outside for many years in a children's playground in San Diego, suffering considerable corrosion, and had become seriously deteriorated. In 1959 it was donated to the Museum through the cooperation of the San Diego Squadron of the Air Force Association. In October 2008 the aircraft was returned to display following an extensive eight year restoration. Many parts had to be reverse engineered by the Museum's restoration staff. Four different aircraft serial numbers were found on parts throughout the airframe, indicating reassembly from three different wrecks brought back to the U.S. for examination, or wartime assembly or repair from parts obtained from three different aircraft. Serial number 5312 was found in the most locations, and is the number now cited. This N1K2-Ja is painted as an aircraft in the Yokosuka Kōkūtai, an evaluation and test unit. This is indicated by the tail code (Yo)ヨ-105.

The third example (s/n 5341, tail code A343-35) is owned by the National Air and Space Museum but was restored by the Champlin Fighter Museum at Falcon Field, Mesa, Arizona, in return for the right to display the aircraft at Falcon Field for 10 years after restoration. It currently is on display at the National Air and Space Museum's Steven F. Udvar-Hazy Center

The fourth authentic Shiden-Kai is displayed in a local museum at Nanreku Misho Koen in Ehime Prefecture, Shikoku, Japan. This aircraft is known to be from the 343rd Kōkūtai, as the unit flew sorties in the area, but the tail code is unknown as it was partially restored from a corroded wreck recovered from the sea. After an aerial battle on July 24, 1945, its pilot ditched the aircraft in the waters of the Bungo Channel, but he was never found; by the time of the aircraft's recovery from the seabed on July 14, 1979, he could be identified only as one of six pilots from the 343rd squadron who disappeared that day. Photographs of the six—including Takashi Oshibuchi, commander of the 701 Hikōtai, and Kaneyoshi Muto—are displayed under the aircraft engine. In 2019, the aircraft was restored to non-flying condition. 

The fifth N1K Kyōfū is located on display at the National Museum of the Pacific War in Fredricksburg, Texas.

Specifications (N1K1-J)

See also

References

Notes

Citations

Bibliography
 
  (new edition 1987 by Putnam Aeronautical Books, .)
 
 Galbiati, Fabio. "Battaglia Aerea del 19 Marzo su Kure.(in Italian)." Storia Militare magazine, Albertelli edizioni, N.166, July 2007.
 
 Green, William. Warplanes of the Second World War, Volume Three: Fighters. London: Macdonald & Co. (Publishers) Ltd., 1961 (seventh impression 1973). .

 Koseski, Krystian. Kawanishi N1K1/N1k2-J "Shiden/Kai" (in Polish). Warszawa, Poland: Wydawnictwo Susei, 1991. .
 Mondey, David. The Hamlyn Concise Guide to Axis Aircraft of World War II. London: Bounty Books, 2006. .
 Sakaida, Henry. Imperial Japanese Navy Aces, 1937–45. Botley, Oxford, UK: Osprey Publishing, 1998. .
 Sakaida, Henry and Koji Takaki. Genda's Blade: Japan's Squadron of Aces, 343 Kōkūtai. Hersham, Surrey, UK: Classic Publications, 2003. .

External links

 TACI 107A1 Report "George 11" 

1940s Japanese fighter aircraft
World War II Japanese fighter aircraft
Kawanishi aircraft
Kawanishi N1K
Single-engined tractor aircraft
Mid-wing aircraft
Aircraft first flown in 1942